South Africa competed at the 2010 Summer Youth Olympics, the inaugural Youth Olympic Games, held in Singapore from 14 August to 26 August 2010. The nation was represented by the South Africa Olympic Committee, which sent a total of sixty-two athletes to compete in thirteen sports. The flagbearer at the opening ceremony for the nation was fencer Wanda Matshaya.

Medalists 
The following South African athletes won medals at the Games, all dates shown are August 2010. In the results sections below, medallists' names are emboldened.  Names that italicised were a part of a Mixed NOC Event and do not count towards overall medal count.

Athletics

Boys
Track and Road Events

Field Events

Girls
Track and Road Events

Field Events

Basketball

Boys

 Qualifying Round – Group D

 Qualified for quarterfinals
 9th–16th placement games
 17th–20th placement games

 17th–20th placement matches

Canoeing

Boys

Girls

Cycling

Cross Country

Time Trial

BMX

Road Race

Overall

Equestrian

Fencing

Group Stage

Knock-Out Stage

Gymnastics

Artistic Gymnastics

Boys

Girls

Rhythmic Gymnastics 

Individual

Trampoline

Field hockey

Rowing

Swimming

Boys

Girls

Mixed

Triathlon

Men's

Mixed

Weightlifting

Wrestling

Freestyle

Greco-Roman

References

External links
 Competitors List: South Africa – Singapore 2010 official site
 Schedule/Results – Singapore 2010 official site
 SA’s squad of 63 for Youth Olympics – Swimming South Africa official site

Nations at the 2010 Summer Youth Olympics
Summer Youth Olympics
South Africa at the Youth Olympics